The Department of Administrative Services was an Australian government department that existed between January 1994 and October 1997. It was the fourth so-named Commonwealth department.

Scope
Information about the department's functions and/or government funding allocation could be found in the Administrative Arrangements Orders, the annual Portfolio Budget Statements and in the Department's annual reports.

At the department's creation, it dealt with:
Acquisition, leasing, management and disposal of land and property in Australia and overseas
Transport and storage services
Co-ordination of purchasing policy and civil purchasing
Disposal of goods
Analytical laboratory services
Ionospheric prediction
Valuation services
Geodesy, mapping and surveying services
Planning, execution and maintenance of Commonwealth Government works  
Design and maintenance of Government furniture, furnishings and fittings  Government printing and publishing services
Electoral matters
Australian honours and symbols policy
Provision of facilities for members of Parliament other than in Parliament House
Administrative support for Royal Commissions and certain other inquiries  
Information co-ordination and services within Australia, including advertising.

Structure
The Department was an Australian Public Service department, staffed by officials who were responsible to the Minister for Administrative Services.

References

Ministries established in 1994
Administrative Services
1994 establishments in Australia
1997 disestablishments in Australia